"Get Lost" is a song by Swedish synthpop duo Icona Pop released as a single on June 23, 2014 by TEN Music Group in Sweden where it peaked at number 58 on the weekly singles chart. It is the first musical work published by the duo after their debut album "This Is... Icona Pop".

Composition
"Get Lost" is a pop song with some country and teen influences with a tempo of 128 beats for minute. The chorus contains prolonged vocals and the bridge is made of anthemic howls. The lyrics speak about free life and they are characterized by punky expressions and shouts similar to those of their hit "I Love It". The duo cited Miley Cyrus as a source of inspiration in an interview with E! News in their pursue of success, calling her very able to balance work and play. They said Miley "would never risk a show by going out" and is "down-to-earth," "hardworking" and "very professional."

Critical reception
The critics praised the song calling it "undeniably effective", but also "not enough different from their other hits". Stereogum defined it as a gleaming weapons-grade hook-delivery machine with a chorus that sounds bigger than the known universe. Speaking about it, SPIN reviewed the song saying that "Some will balk at the totemic, EDM-flavored synth parts that function as the building blocks of this song, but the sweetness of the duo's gang vocals more than round off those sonic jagged edges" 
Idolator.com called "Get Lost" the "stuff of rebellious and youthful gold, as the girls escape the world in a sea of storming beats and battle cries".

Music video
The official lyric video for "Get Lost" was premiered on YouTube on July 14, 2014. It was directed by Paul Jerndal. A live performance of the song was released on VEVO on September 22, 2014.

Chart performance

References

2014 songs
Icona Pop songs